Mastercam (also MasterCAM) is a suite of Computer-Aided Manufacturing (CAM) and CAD/CAM software applications. Founded in MA in 1983, CNC Software, LLC is one of the oldest developers of PC-based computer-aided design / computer-aided manufacturing (CAD/CAM) software. They are one of the first to introduce CAD/CAM software designed for both machinists and engineers. Mastercam, CNC Software's main product, started as a 2D CAM system with CAD tools that let machinists design virtual parts on a computer screen and also guided computer numerical controlled (CNC) machine tools in the manufacture of parts. Since then, Mastercam has grown into the most widely used CAD/CAM package in the world. CNC Software, LLC is now located in Tolland, Connecticut.

Mastercam users can create and cut parts using one of many supplied machine and control definitions, or they can use Mastercam's tools to create their own customized definitions.

Mastercam also offers a level of flexibility that allows the integration of 3rd party applications, called C-hooks,  to address unique machine or process specific scenarios.

Mastercam's name is a double entendre: it implies mastery of CAM (computer-aided manufacturing), which involves today's latest machine tool control technology; and it simultaneously pays homage to yesterday's machine tool control technology by echoing the older term master cam, which referred to the main cam or model that a tracer followed in order to control the movements of a mechanically automated machine tool.

In November 2018, Mastercam launched  mastersofcam.com, a website content-driven platform for Mastercam users.

Mastercam product levels
With the release of Mastercam 2017, Mastercam entered the 3rd interface in the product history moving to a familiar Microsoft Office tab format. Prior to Mastercam 2017 was Version X that was introduced in 2005. With Version X the application became a true Windows-based application, as opposed to one ported over from DOS.  It also represented a fundamental shift in the way the application was configured. Mastercam supports many types of machines, each with a choice of levels of functionality, as well as offers optional add-ins for 4-axis and 5-axis machining. The following list describes the Mastercam product levels that were updated with the release of Mastercam 2017:

 Design—3D wireframe geometry creation, surface And solid modeling, dimensioning, importing and exporting of non-Mastercam CAD files (such as AutoCAD, SolidWorks, Solid Edge, Inventor, Parasolid, etc.).
 Mill Entry—Includes Design, basic 2-2 1/2 axis machining including associative contouring, zigzag and one way pocketing, drilling operations and full toolpath verification.
 Mill—Includes Mill Entry, 2-3 axis single surface machining plus limited multi-surface rough pocketing and finish parallel machining. Also positional 4th axis rotary support. Includes Engrave, Rast2Vec, Nesting.
 Mill 3D—Includes Mill plus additional support multi-surface machining up to 3-axis.
 Multi-Axis add-on—5-Axis roughing, finishing, flowline multisurface, contour, depth cuts, drilling, advanced gouge checking.
 Mill-Turn add-on—Includes full machine simulation and the ability to synchronize multiple code streams including pinch/balance turning.  Requires Mill 3D or Mill Lathe, and a .machine file.
 Lathe Entry— Includes Design, Solids and 2-axis fully associative turning functionality and full tool-path verification.
 Lathe— Full 2-axis turning functionality with C&Y-axis machining and part handling operations.  Additional functionality gained by bundling with appropriate Mill package.
 Router Entry— Includes Design basic 2-2 1/2 axis machining including associative contouring, zigzag and one way pocketing, drilling operations and full toolpath verification.
 Router—Includes Router Entry, 2-3 axis single surface machining plus limited multi-surface rough pocketing and finish parallel machining.  Includes Engrave, Rast2Vec, Nesting.
 Router 3D—Includes Mill plus additional For multi-surface machining up to 3-axis.  Includes Design, Engrave, Rast2Vec, Nesting, and Solids
 Wire—Includes Design plus 2-axis and 4-axis package for Wire EDM applications.
 Art add-on—Quick 3D design, 2D outlines into 3D shapes, shape blending, conversion of 2D artwork into machinable geometry, plus exclusive fast toolpaths, rough and finish strategies, on-screen part cutting.

The Router products are targeted to the woodworking industries but are virtually identical to the Mill line with additional of support for router specific functions such as aggregate heads, drill blocks and saws.

References

External links
 CNC Software/Mastercam

Companies based in Tolland County, Connecticut
Software companies based in Connecticut
Computer-aided manufacturing software
Technology companies of the United States
Tolland, Connecticut
Numerical control
1983 establishments in Massachusetts
Software companies of the United States